Vanesa Raquel Siley (born 19 August 1984) is an Argentine lawyer, trade unionist and politician, currently serving as National Deputy representing Buenos Aires Province. A member of the Justicialist Party, Siley was elected in 2017 for the Unidad Ciudadana coalition, and currently sits in the Frente de Todos bloc.

Early life and career
Siley was born on 19 August 1984 in Mercedes, in Buenos Aires Province. She is a lawyer. She is a member of La Cámpora. Her political career began in the judicial workers' trade union Unión de Empleados Judiciales de la Nación (UJEN); in 2014, she contested the leadership of UJEN leader Julio Piumato, and won in the Buenos Aires section. Following her victory in the Capital, Siley formed the Sindicato de Trabajadores Judiciales (Sitraju), a Buenos Aires-based union.

Political career
Siley ran for a seat in the Argentine Chamber of Deputies in the 2017 legislative election; she was the fourth candidate in the Unidad Ciudadana list in Buenos Aires Province. The Unidad Ciudadana list received 36.28% of the votes, and Siley was elected. She was sworn in on 6 December 2017.

As a national deputy, Siley formed part of the parliamentary commissions on Labour Legislation (which she presides), political trials, justice, general legislation, criminal legislation, and freedom of expression, as well as the permanent bicameral commission on the National Public Ministry. She was a supporter of the 2020 Voluntary Interruption of Pregnancy bill, which legalized abortion in Argentina.

On 27 December 2019, she was sworn in as one of the Chamber of Deputies' representatives in the Council of Magistracy of the Nation. In 2020, she introduced a petition of political trial against Supreme Court of Argentina president Carlos Rosenkrantz.

Electoral history

References

External links
Profile on the official website of the Chamber of Deputies (in Spanish)

Living people
1984 births
People from Mercedes, Buenos Aires
Argentine trade union leaders
Members of the Argentine Chamber of Deputies elected in Buenos Aires Province
Women members of the Argentine Chamber of Deputies
Members of the Argentine Council of Magistracy
Members of La Cámpora
21st-century Argentine politicians
21st-century Argentine women politicians